Sonie is a surname. Notable people with the surname include:

Bhappi Sonie (1928–2001), Indian film director
Varmah Sonie (born 1990), American football player

See also
Soni (name)